WQBS (870 AM), branded on-air as WQBS 870 AM, is a radio station broadcasting a Talk/Personality format. Licensed to San Juan, Puerto Rico, it serves the Puerto Rico area.  The station is currently owned by Aerco Broadcasting Corporation.

WQBS is the flagship station of the Camarero Radio Network, dedicated to horse racing.

WQBS's audio signal was broadcast on WSJU-TV channel 31.4 in San Juan. branded as WQBS TV. WQBS TV is the first over-the-air television channel that broadcasts programming from a radio station. WQBS Radio & WQBS TV broadcasts from studios in the IBC-AERCO Building in Rio Piedras. The channel ceased operations on September 5, 2018.

External links
FCC History Cards for WQBS

QBS
Radio stations established in 1954
1954 establishments in Puerto Rico
QBS (AM)
Horse racing in Puerto Rico